Vanity Fair (1923) is a silent feature film directed by Hugo Ballin and released by Samuel Goldwyn.

Production background
The film included one sequence filmed in color by Prizmacolor. This silent film was a version of the 1848 novel Vanity Fair by William Makepeace Thackeray. The film starred Ballin's wife Mabel Ballin as Becky Sharp and Hobart Bosworth as the Marquis of Steyne.

Cast
 Mabel Ballin as Becky Sharp
 Hobart Bosworth as Marquis of Steyne
 George Walsh as Rawdon Crawley
 Harrison Ford as George Osborne
 Earle Foxe as Captain Dobbin
 Willard Louis as Joseph Sedley
 Eleanor Boardman as Amelia Sedley
 Bobby Mack as Sir Pitt Crawley (as Robert Mack)
 William J. Humphrey as Mr Sedley (credited as William Humphreys)
 Dorcas Matthews as Lady Jane
 Laura La Varnie as Miss Crawley
 James A. Marcus as Old Osborne
 Eugene Acker as Max
 Leo White as Isadore
 Tempe Pigott as Mrs Sedley

Preservation status
Vanity Fair is now considered to be a lost film.

See also
List of lost films

References

External links

Vanity Fair at Virtual History

1923 films
1920s color films
American silent feature films
Films based on Vanity Fair (novel)
Films directed by Hugo Ballin
Goldwyn Pictures films
Lost American films
Silent films in color
1923 drama films
Silent American drama films
Films set in London
Films about social class
1923 lost films
Lost drama films
1920s American films